One Offs... Remixes & B-Sides is a compilation album released in 2002 by the British electronic music artist Bonobo. It features rare and previously unreleased work, and remixes of tracks from his first album Animal Magic. The album was released in 2002 on the Tru Thoughts label. The song Scuba appears in the racing game Need for Speed: Undercover.

Track listing
The tracks 4, 6, 7, 10, and 11 are written and performed by Bonobo; others are credited as is.

References

Bonobo (musician) compilation albums
2002 remix albums
2002 compilation albums
B-side compilation albums